= Newsagency =

Newsagency may refer to:

- News agency, an organization of journalists established to supply news reports to organizations in the news trade
- Newsagent's shop, or Newsagency in Australian English
